Messianic Bible translations are translations, or editions of translations, in English of the Christian Bible, some of which are widely used in the Messianic Judaism and Hebrew Roots communities.

They are not the same as Jewish English Bible translations, although they are often translated by Jewish Christian scholars. They are often not standard straight English translations of the Christian Bible, but are translations which specifically incorporate Jewish elements for a Jewish audience.

These elements include, but are not limited to, the use of the Hebrew names for all books, the Hebrew Bible (Tanakh) ordering for the books of the Old Testament, both testaments being named their Hebrew names (Tanakh and Brit Chadasha). This approach also includes the New Testament being translated with the preference of spelling names (people, concepts and place names) in transliterated Hebrew rather than directly translated from Greek into English. Some Sacred Name Bibles such as the Hallelujah Scriptures, conform to these elements and therefore may be considered Messianic Bibles as well.

English

Complete Jewish Bible (CJB) 

The Complete Jewish Bible (sometimes referred to as the CJB) is a translation of the Bible into English by  David H. Stern. It consists of both Stern's revised translation of the Old Testament (Tanakh) plus his original Jewish New Testament (B'rit Hadashah) translation in one volume. It was published in its entirety in 1998 by Jewish New Testament Publications, Inc.

The Old Testament translation is a paraphrase of the public domain 1917 Jewish Publication Society Version, although scholar Bruce Metzger notes that where Stern disagreed with the JPS version, he translated from the Masoretic Text himself. The New Testament section is Stern's original translation from the ancient Greek.

Stern states that his purpose for producing the Complete Jewish Bible was "to restore God's Word to its original Jewish context and culture as well as be in easily read modern English." This translation was also intended to be fully functional for Messianic Jewish congregations.

Stern follows the order and the names of the Old Testament books in the Hebrew Bible, rather than those of typical Christian Bibles. He uses Hebrew names for people and places, such as Eliyahu for "Elijah", and Sha'ul for "Saul." The work also incorporates Hebrew and Yiddish expressions that Stern refers to as "Jewish English", such as matzah for "unleavened bread" and mikveh for "ritual immersion pool".

Tree of Life Version of the Holy Scriptures (TLV)

The Tree of Life Version  (abbreviated as "TLV"), first published in 2011, is a Messianic Jewish translation of the Hebrew Bible (or TA-NA-KH) and the New Testament (or New Covenant) sponsored by the Messianic Jewish Family Bible Society and The King's University.

According to the publisher, Baker Books, the Tree of Life Version (TLV) is intended to be a translation that "speaks with a decidedly Jewish-friendly voice [...] to recover the authentic context of the Bible and the Christian faith." The sponsors of the translation sought to restore to the biblical texts "their actual Jewish essence," which, in their view, is lost in most English translations. Specifically, the project sought to restore "the Jewish order of the books of the Old Testament," "the Jewish name of the Messiah, Yeshua," "reverence for the four-letter unspoken name of God," and "Hebrew transliterated terms, such as shalom, shofar, and shabbat." Prior to the publication of the TLV in its entirety, It was previously published either with the TLV New Covenant alone or bound together with the public domain 1917 Jewish Publication Society Version Tanakh as the Messianic Jewish Shared Heritage Bible.

The team of Messianic Jewish and Christian scholars commissioned to work on the project included Dr. Jeffrey L. Seif, Rabbi Dr. Jeffrey Feinberg, Rabbi Dr. Glenn Blank, Dr. Hellene Dallaire, Rabbi Jeff Adler, Rabbi Barney Kasdan, Dr. Vered Hillel. Other contributors included Mark Anthony, Michael L. Brown, Dr. Jack Cairns, Dr. Mordechai Cohen, Pat Feinberg, Dr. John Fischer, Dr. Patrice Fischer, Dr. Steve Galiley, Dr. Ray Gannon, Dr. Henri Goulet, Dr. Ihab Griess, David Harris, Dr. Stanley Horton, Dr. Daniel Juster, Liz Kasdan, Elliot Klayman, Dr. Seth Klayman, Dr. Craig Keener, Phillip Lanning, Dr. Barrie Mallin, Dr. Shawn Moir, Dr. Richard Nicol, Dr. Seth Postell, Dr. David Rothstein, Dr. Noel Rabinowitz, Dr. Rich Robinson, Dr. Matthew Salathe, Dr. Jim Sibley, Josh Sofaer, Dr. Greg Stone, Rabbi Eric Tokajer, John Taylor, Myles Weiss, Dr. Randy Weiss, Dr. Lon Wiksel, and Dr. Wayne Wilks.

Messianic Jewish Literal Translation of the New Covenant Scriptures (MJLT NCS)

The Messianic Jewish Literal Translation (MJLT) is a Messianic Jewish Bible translation based on Young's Literal Translation (YLT). The MJLT is a re-rendering of the YLT for the modern, Messianic reader, which the publisher says is meant to restore the Jewish perspective of Scripture which has been "obscured by deeply ingrained anti-Jewish, anti-Torah preconceptions."

Though the translation is meant to bring out the Messianic Jewish context and meaning of the New Covenant Scriptures, the publisher says that it is meant for all believers, whether Jewish or Gentile, who "desire the word’s pure milk." In addition to being Messianic Jewish in nature, the MJLT seeks to put forth the meaning of the original language by giving a literal, word-for-word rendering from Greek to English.

This Bible version has several unusual features:
 The actual Hebrew lettering with transliteration for various names, places and terms is printed in line with the English text of the MJLT, accentuating the Jewishness of Scripture. Terms and names such as תּוֹרָה, Torah and יֵשׁוּעַ, Yeshua, and titles of books such as מַתִּתְיָהוּ‬ Matit’yahu (Matthew) contain the actual Hebrew lettering.
 The sequence of books has been rearranged, first, according to the author's original audience (either Jewish, or both Jewish and Gentile together), and second, chronologically, according to the order in which they were written.
  Special notations show the reader when and where Paul wrote his letters in relation to the events recorded in the Book of Acts.

New Jerusalem Version (NJV)

The New Jerusalem Version is an English Messianic Bible translation first published in 2019 by Hineni Publishers. It is primarily an update of the 1901 ASV, WEB and “The Holy Scriptures According to the Masoretic Text,’’ published in 1917 by the Jewish Publication Society. It consists of both the TANAKH (Old Testament) and the Brit Chadashah (New Covenant). The TANAKH is based on the Masoretic text and the Brit Chadashah is mainly based on the Majority Text.

According to the Publisher, Hineni Publishers, the goal of the New Jerusalem Version is to make the personal name of God known to English-speaking people from all around the world, and to help the reader to rediscover the Hebrew roots of the Bible. Where the personal unutterable name of God occurs in the Masoretic Text, the original Hebrew יהוה (the Tetragrammaton) has been preserved; and the name of the Messiah has been transliterated from Hebrew: Yeshua. Book titles are in both English and Hebrew, and several Hebrew words such as shalom, Torah, kohen, Sheol, Gehinnom, etc. have been transliterated.

The publisher states the New Jerusalem Version distinguishes itself from most English Bibles by restoring the:
 Personal unutterable Hebrew name of God: יהוה
 Hebrew name of the Messiah: Yeshua
 Feasts of God: Pesach, Shavuot, Yom Kippur, etc.
 Names of God: Adonai Elohim Tzva’ot, El Shaddai, El Elyon, etc.
 Order of books: following the Jewish tradition of the TANAKH (Torah, Nevi’im, Ketuvim).

Other versions

 World Messianic Bible. "The World Messianic Bible (WMB) is a Modern English update of the American Standard Version. It has also been known as the Hebrew Names Version (HNV) and the World English Bible: Messianic Edition (WEB:ME)."
 New Messianic Version Bible. "The New Messianic Version Bible (NMVB) or (NMV) is a Modern English update of the King James Version, with corrections made in select passages to clarify the Hebrew or Greek. In addition to transliterating proper names, it translates them in-line with the text. The result is a reading similar to the Amplified Bible.
 Orthodox Jewish Bible. "The Orthodox Jewish Bible (OJB), completed by Phillip Goble in 2002, is an English language version that applies Yiddish and Hasidic cultural expressions to the Messianic Bible.
 The Living Scriptures. "The Living Scriptures" is the Messianic edition of The Living Bible.

References

External links
 World Messianic Bible

Bible translations into English